Johann Gottlob Böhme (20 March 1717 in Wurzen – 20 June 1780 in Leipzig) was a German historian.

Beginning in 1736 he studied history at the University of Leipzig. In 1747 he acquired his magister degree at Leipzig, where four years later he became an associate professor at the faculty of philosophy. In 1758 he succeeded Christian Gottlieb Jöcher as professor of history at the university.

On four separate occasions he served as rector at the University of Leipzig. In 1766 he was appointed councilor and court historiographer for the Electorate of Saxony. In 1875, the thoroughfare Böhmestraße in Gohlis (today part of Leipzig) was named in his honor.

Published works 
In 1763–65 he published a highly regarded work on the Peace of Oliva (1660), titled Acta pacis Oliviensis inedita (2 volumes). Other noted written efforts by Böhme include:
 De commerciorum apud Germanos initiis, Leipzig (1751).
 De ortu regiae dignitatis in Polonia recitatio academica, (1754).
 De Henrico VIII. Anglorum rege Imperium Romanum post obitum Maximiliani I. adfectante, Leipzig (1758).
 Epitome rerum Germanicarum ab anno Chr. 1617 ad an. 1643, (1760).
 De nationis Germanicae in curia Romana protectione dissertatio, (1763).
 De ordine Draconis instituto a Sigismundo Imp. prolusio, Leipzig (1764).
 Carmina latina, vel repetite vel primum edita, Leipzig (1780).

References 

1717 births
1780 deaths
People from Wurzen
People from the Electorate of Saxony
18th-century German historians
Leipzig University alumni
Academic staff of Leipzig University
Rectors of Leipzig University
18th-century German writers
18th-century German male writers